Jay Michael Weiss is an American psychologist.

He graduated from Lafayette College with a B.A. in Psychology in 1962, and Yale University with a Ph.D. in Psychology in 1967.

Awards
1984 MacArthur Fellows Program
Society of Behavioral Medicine Fellow

Works
"Effects of Coping Responses on Stress." Journal of Comparative and Physiological Psychology. Vol 65(2), Apr 1968, 251-260.
"Psychological Factors in Stress and Disease", Scientific American, June 1972: 104-13
"Does decreased sucrose intake indicate loss of preference in CMS model?", Journal	Psychopharmacology, Springer Berlin / Heidelberg, ISSN 0033-3158 Issue Volume 134, Number 4 / December, 1997
"Effects of chronic antidepressant drug administration and electroconvulsive shock on locus coeruleus electrophysiologic activity", Biological Psychiatry, Volume 49, Issue 2, Pages 117-129 (15 January 2001)

References

American psychiatrists
Living people
Year of birth missing (living people)
Lafayette College alumni
Yale Graduate School of Arts and Sciences alumni
Emory University faculty
MacArthur Fellows